The men's 800m Freestyle event at the 2006 Central American and Caribbean Games occurred on Tuesday, July 18, 2006, at the S.U. Pedro de Heredia Aquatic Complex in Cartagena, Colombia. This was a time-final event, meaning that the swimmers only swam it once and whatever their time from that swim was then used for the final ranking.

Records

Results

References

Men's 800 Free results from the official website of the 2006 Central American and Caribbean Games; retrieved 2009-06-29.

Freestyle, Men's 800m